Serge Mputu-Bandu Mbungu (born 21 May 1980) is a Congolese footballer.

International career
The midfielder was a member of the DR Congo a football team in Congo.

References

1980 births
Living people
Footballers from Kinshasa
Democratic Republic of the Congo footballers
Democratic Republic of the Congo international footballers
Democratic Republic of the Congo expatriate footballers
2000 African Cup of Nations players
K.S.C. Lokeren Oost-Vlaanderen players
Belgian Pro League players
Association football forwards
Expatriate footballers in Angola
Expatriate footballers in Belgium
Expatriate footballers in Sudan
Democratic Republic of the Congo expatriate sportspeople in Belgium
Democratic Republic of the Congo expatriate sportspeople in Angola
Al-Hilal Club (Omdurman) players
AS Vita Club players
S.L. Benfica (Luanda) players
K.R.C. Zuid-West-Vlaanderen players